Lady of Paradise (Italian: La signora Paradiso) is a 1934 Italian comedy film directed by Enrico Guazzoni and starring Elsa De Giorgi, Mino Doro and Memo Benassi.

It was shot at the Tirrenia Studios. The film's sets were designed by the art director Alfredo Montori.

Cast
 Elsa De Giorgi as Anna Lucenti 
 Mino Doro as Delfo Delfi 
 Memo Benassi as Matteo Iran 
 Franco Coop as Geremia Bianchi 
 Augusto Marcacci as Il conte 
 Enzo Biliotti as Lukas 
 Ernesto Marini
 Ugo Gracci 
 Paolo Bernacchi

References

Bibliography 
 Goble, Alan. The Complete Index to Literary Sources in Film. Walter de Gruyter, 1999.

External links 
 

1934 films
Italian comedy films
1934 comedy films
1930s Italian-language films
Films directed by Enrico Guazzoni
Italian black-and-white films
Films shot at Tirrenia Studios
1930s Italian films